Dunkin' Donuts LLC, also known as Dunkin' and by the initials DD, is an American multinational coffee and doughnut company, as well as a quick service restaurant. It was founded by Bill Rosenberg (1916–2002) in Quincy, Massachusetts, in 1950. The chain was acquired by Baskin-Robbins's holding company Allied Lyons in 1990; its acquisition of the Mister Donut chain and the conversion of that chain to Dunkin' Donuts facilitated the brand's growth in North America that year. Dunkin' and Baskin-Robbins eventually became subsidiaries of Dunkin' Brands, headquartered in Canton, Massachusetts, in 2004, until being purchased by Inspire Brands on December 15, 2020. The chain began rebranding as a "beverage-led company", and was renamed Dunkin', in January 2019; while stores in the U.S. began using the new name, the rebranding will eventually be rolled out to all of its international stores.

With approximately 12,900 locations in 42 countries, Dunkin' is one of the largest coffee shop and donut shop chains in the world.  Its products include donuts, bagels, coffee, and "Munchkins" donut holes.

History

1948–1963: Founding years

Bill Rosenberg opened Open Kettle in 1948, a restaurant selling donuts and coffee in Quincy, Massachusetts (a suburb of Boston), but he changed the name in 1950 to Dunkin' Donuts after discussing with company executives. He conceived the idea for the restaurant after his experiences selling food in factories and at construction sites, where donuts and coffee were the two most popular items. The restaurant was successful, and Rosenberg sold franchises to others starting in 1955.

1963–1998: Bob Rosenberg
In 1963 Rosenberg's son Bob became CEO of the company at age 25, and Dunkin' Donuts opened its hundredth location that year. Dunkin' Donuts was a subsidiary of Universal Food Systems at the time, a conglomerate of 10 small food-service businesses, and Dunkin' Donuts locations varied greatly in their menu options, with some selling full breakfasts and others serving only donuts and coffee.

In the following years, the other businesses in the Universal Food Systems portfolio were sold or closed, and the company was renamed to Dunkin' Donuts. The menu and shop format was standardized, and various new menu items were introduced. In the early 1980s counter service and ceramic coffee cups were replaced by self-service counters and paper cups. The chain went public in 1968 and was acquired by Baskin-Robbins owner Allied Lyons in 1990. By 1998, the brand had grown to 2,500 locations worldwide with $2 billion in annual sales.

Dunkin' Donuts expanded in the 1990s by buying out two rival chains: Mister Donut and Dawn Donuts.

1998–present: After Bob Rosenberg

At some point, the chain produced a donut specifically designed for dunking, with a handle. This was discontinued in 2003 (except in Singapore) because it was hand-cut and uneconomical compared to machine-cut donuts.

In 2004 the company's headquarters were relocated to Canton, Massachusetts. In December 2005 Dunkin' Donuts and Baskin-Robbins (by then, operating under the name Dunkin' Brands) were sold to a private equity consortium of Bain Capital, Carlyle Group, and Thomas H. Lee Partners for $2.4 billion. By 2010, Dunkin' Donuts' global sales were $6 billion.

In June 2013 Dunkin' Donuts unveiled a new store design, the brand's first in almost seven years.

The Dunkin' Donuts location in Natick, Massachusetts launched a program to test the concept of curbside pickup in December 2016.

In January 2018 Dunkin' Donuts began to open new concept locations, beginning in Quincy, featuring modern decor, cold beverages on tap and a single-cup brewing machine, more packaged take-out options, and dedicated pick-up lines for mobile ordering inside and in the drive-thru. The concept was described as being part of a shift towards becoming an "on-the-go, beverage-led brand". In addition, the location, as well as others, began to trial signage referring to the chain as simply "Dunkin—removing "Donuts" from the name.

In February 2018 Dunkin' announced plans to phase out polystyrene foam cups globally for environmental purposes by April 2020.

On July 11, 2018, Dave Hoffmann took over from Nigel Travis to become the CEO. He is looking to add 1,000 new locations outside of the Northeastern United States by the end of 2020 and to have a revenue increase of 3 percent for stores open a year or longer. Also late 2018, Dunkin' installed espresso machines at all possible locations and launched espresso products using a new recipe.

In June 2019 Dunkin' partnered with Grubhub to begin the rollout of its new Dunkin' Delivers service. Later in July 2019, Dunkin' partnered with Beyond Meat to introduce a meatless breakfast sandwich in Manhattan, becoming the first U.S. restaurant brand to serve Beyond Sausage. The sandwich launched nationally later in 2019.

In September 2019 the New York attorney general's office alleged in a lawsuit that Dunkin' mishandled a series of cyberattacks that were directed at customers using the Dunkin' mobile app. These attacks took place in early 2015 and thousands of usernames and passwords stolen. The state lawsuit alleges that Dunkin' employees knew about these attacks, but failed to take appropriate action.

In October 2020 Dunkin' Brands stated that the company was in conversation with Inspire Brands, a private equity-backed company, negotiating to sell the company. Inspire Brands announced on Saturday, October 31, 2020, that they would be acquiring Dunkin' Brands Group for $11.3 billion, which would include Dunkin' Brands' debt that Inspire Brands would be taking on. Inspire would pay $106.50 in cash for each of Dunkin' Brands' shares. On December 15, 2020, the acquisition was completed, and Dunkin' Brands ceased to exist as a separate company, with Dunkin', Baskin-Robbins, and the trademark management of Mister Donut,  becoming part of Inspire Brands.

Marketing

Dunkin' Donuts' "It's Worth the Trip" campaign starred sleepy-eyed "Fred the Baker" and featured the catchphrase "Time to make the donuts". It won honors from the Television Bureau of Advertising as one of the five best television advertisements of the 1980s. Fred the Baker was played by actor Michael Vale for 15 years until his retirement in 1997.  The catchphrase was used in the title of founder William Rosenberg's autobiography Time to Make the Donuts: The Founder of Dunkin' Donuts Shares an American Journey.

Dunkin' Donuts changed its slogan in March 2006 to "America Runs on Dunkin. They Might Be Giants songs were featured in a series of advertisements of new products to boost summer sales. In 2007, a series of Dunkin' Donuts commercials referred to the fictional language "Fritalian".  "Is it French? Or is it Italian?" sings a chorus of customers facing a long menu of non-English terms. "Perhaps Fritalian?" was created by Hill Holliday to "poke fun at pretentious Starbucks-style coffee chains, with patrons attempting to order hard-to-pronounce lattes." The commercial was interpreted as a deliberate mocking of Starbucks. The commercials' punch line is: "Delicious lattes from Dunkin' Donuts. You order them in English". It has been a point of discussion that latte, cappuccino, and espresso are loanwords from Italian which have no equivalence in English. The commercials, however, refer to the Starbucks ordering language itself, poking fun at words such as grande and venti. Further commercials in 2007 more directly mocked Starbucks, with a customer ordering a "large" and being chastised to use the term "dieci".

Rachael Ray starred in commercials for Dunkin' Donuts beginning in 2007. In May 2008 Dunkin' Donuts removed a commercial from its website featuring Ray wearing a scarf with a black and white paisley floral design, in response to columnist Michelle Malkin's claims that the scarf resembled the keffiyeh worn by Yasser Arafat and therefore a sign of support for terrorists. Dunkin' Donuts pulled that commercial off the air, leading to criticism of the company's perceived kowtowing to special interests.

In March 2009, the company unveiled the alternate slogan "You 'Kin Do It!" and launched a $100 million ad campaign promotion. In 2017, the company announced that it would begin testing the name of simply "Dunkin at some retail locations, as they would like to be thought of as a destination for coffee, its most profitable product. The branding would be implemented in other locations in the latter half of 2018 if it was successful. The brand announced that it would be known simply as Dunkin' in September 2018.

On April 3, 2018, Dunkin' Donuts teamed up with the Massachusetts shoe manufacturer, Saucony to produce a strawberry-frosted donut themed running shoe to commemorate the 122nd running of the Boston Marathon. The Saucony X Dunkin' Kinvara 9 came in a donut box and the heel of the shoe was covered in rainbow sprinkles.

Logo

A script version of the words Dunkin' Donuts was filed on March 31, 1955, and registered on February 2, 1960. A later logo was for a drawing and word logo depicting a figure with a donut for a head and a coffee cup and donut body wearing a garrison cap, with Dunkin''' emblazoned on both the coffee cup and cap. The design was rendered primarily in yellow and brown. The logo was applied for on June 23, 1958, registered on May 23, 1961, and put into use on July 1, 1964.

In 1961, the company began using a hot pink color for its branding and used a logo showing a stylized coffee cup with the company's name rendered on one line as a circle, evoking a donut dunking into the cup. In 1980 bright orange was added to the hot pink. As of 2014 the logo was a variation of the logo that has been in use since about 1980: an all-capitals rendering of the words Dunkin' Donuts (Dunkin' in orange; Donuts in pink) in a thick, Frankfurter typeface with a coffee cup outlined in brown with a "DD" monogram.

In September 2018, the company announced that it would shorten its name to Dunkin', with a wider roll-out beginning in January 2019. The company acknowledged that "Dunkin was already a common shorthand name for the chain among customers and in its marketing (including the slogan "America Runs on Dunkin), and that the rebranding would reflect the chain's continuing shift towards being a "beverage-led" brand at a time when consumers have shown a preference for healthier trends and options as they consume fewer donuts. While stores in the U.S. started using the new name in 2019, the rebranding will eventually be rolled out to all of its international stores.

Primary ad agency
In April 2018, Dunkin' named BBDO as their primary advertising agency. This replaced Hill Holliday, which had been producing print, digital, broadcast, and billboard advertising for almost twenty years. Hill Holliday was the agency responsible for the tagline "America Runs on Dunkin. ARC/Leo Burnett was also named to lead all in-store promotions.

Affiliations
Dunkin' has a close relationship with the Boston Red Sox and the New England Patriots, making commercials at the start of each team's season for promotions. Dunkin' also sponsors other professional sports teams, including the Dallas Cowboys, New York Yankees, New York Mets, Philadelphia Eagles, and Tampa Bay Rays.

In 2001 Dunkin' Donuts purchased the naming rights for the former Providence Civic Center, and renamed it the Dunkin' Donuts Center. The center is currently the home court for the NCAA and Big East Providence Friars men's basketball team from Providence College as well as home ice for the AHL Providence Bruins hockey team. In reference to the center's long association with local college basketball, it is often known locally as "The Dunk".

In January 2014 English football club Liverpool announced a multimillion-pound global partnership with the company.

Dunkin' Donuts signed a sponsorship deal with the National Women's Hockey League in December 2015. As part of the multi-year agreement, Dunkin’ Donuts is the official hot, iced and frozen coffee of the NWHL.

In 2016, Dunkin' became the official "coffee, donut and breakfast sandwich partner" of the National Hockey League.

Locations

United States

On January 16, 2013, Nigel Travis, Dunkin' Brands CEO, announced that the Dunkin' Donuts franchises would be available in California beginning in 2015. In July 2013, Dunkin' Donuts announced that it has signed its first Southern California multi-unit store development agreements with four franchise groups for a total commitment of 45 new restaurants. The first standalone restaurants were expected to open in 2015 in Orange and Los Angeles counties. The chain also planned to expand into more stores in Texas by 2015. On March 10, 2014, the first Dunkin' Donuts/Baskin-Robbins combination store in Southern California opened in Ramona. This is Dunkin' Donuts' third California shop to open, following shops in Barstow and on Camp Pendleton.  Since March 2014, Dunkin' Donuts has opened several additional locations throughout California, including the Los Angeles area. Dunkin' Donuts shops opened in the San Francisco Bay Area in Walnut Creek, Half Moon Bay, and American Canyon in 2016, as well as South San Francisco and Fremont, in 2017.

2014 saw the return of Dunkin' Donuts to the state of Minnesota after nearly a decade's absence, with a new shop opened inside the Kahler Grand Hotel in Rochester.

In the United States, Dunkin' is sometimes paired with Baskin-Robbins ice cream in a single multibranded store. While such locations usually maintain separate counters for each chain (much like co-branded Wendy's–Tim Hortons locations in Canada), depending on business that day, both chains' products can be bought at a single counter (usually Dunkin' Donuts'). The practice of single-counter service is similar to that of multibranded Yum! Brands stores such as KFC–Taco Bell, which share a single kitchen and cashier line.

As of February 9, 2017, all Dunkin' locations are franchisee owned and operated. In addition to its stand-alone shops, Dunkin' shops can be found within many gas stations, supermarkets, mall and airport food courts, and Walmart stores. In July 2013 Dunkin' Donuts opened its 500th restaurant, in New York City. This location is combined with a Baskin-Robbins.

On July 30, 2020, Dunkin' Brands announced it would permanently close 800 shops in the US by the end of the year because of a 20 percent drop of sales in the second quarter during the COVID-19 pandemic, 450 of which are part of the previously announced closing of locations within Speedway gas stations.

International
By March 2014, Dunkin' Donuts' largest international market was South Korea, representing nearly 40 percent of all international sales. With over 900 outlets in the country, it had three times as many as McDonald's, and about a third more than Starbucks. South Korea is home to Dunkin Donuts' only coffee roasting plant outside the U.S. Still, the company sees China and its vastly larger population as the more lucrative opportunity. In 2008 Dunkin' Donuts opened its first restaurant in Shanghai, representing the first step in its China expansion strategy. By March 2014 it had about 50 stores in the country and an agreement to open 100 more over the next five years.

In Australia, Dunkin' Donuts opened in the 1980s but by the late 2000s, they had left the Australian market. In 2014 Dunkin' Brands global chairman Nigel Travis said there were no plans in the short term to return the brand to the Australian market. In Australia, Baskin-Robbins, a subsidiary of Dunkin' Brands, continues to exist in the country.

In Brazil, Dunkin' Donuts opened its first building in 1980. In 2013, it planned to open 25 franchises in the country.

In Colombia, Dunkin' Donuts opened its first store in Bogota in 1983. By 2015, Dunkin' Donuts operated more than 100 stores only in the capital city of the country.  Currently it operates more than 150 stores around the country including locations in the cities of Medellin, Cali, Ibague, Pereira, Manizales and Barranquilla.

In January 2014, Dunkin' Donuts relaunched in England 20 years after it exited the country with its store opening in Harrow, London. There are no Dunkin Donuts stores in Scotland, Northern Ireland or Wales.

On December 5, 2014, Dunkin' Donuts opened their first location in the Nordic region, at the Täby Centrum shopping mall in the outskirts of Stockholm, Sweden. On July 24, 2018, Dunkin Donuts announced that the company's Swedish operations had filed for bankruptcy and all locations in Sweden would close immediately.
On April 1, 2015, the first store in Denmark opened in Copenhagen Central Station and by May 5, 2015, one opened at Roskilde station. There is still one in construction in Odense.

In early December 2015 Dunkin' Donuts opened their first cafe in 13 years in Warsaw, Poland. The opening of a second location in Warsaw is announced for January 2016. In December 2018 a third branch was under construction in the city.

On January 21, 2016, Dunkin' Brands announced a master franchise agreement with Grand Parade Investments Ltd. that called for developing 250 Dunkin' Donuts and 70 Baskin-Robbins outlets throughout South Africa.  The first stores opened in the end of 2016 in the Cape Town area. Eventually, only 11 Dunkin' Donuts locations and five Baskin-Robbins locations opened in South Africa due to GPI's financial trouble. However, by February 2019, Grand Parade Investments announced that it permanently closed all Dunkin' Brands locations in South Africa due to poor performance and unprofitably.

In September 2015, Roland Zanelli, the owner of the Dunkin' Donuts license in Switzerland, announced the opening of the first two stores in Basel, Switzerland in Fall 2015, followed by the opening of up to 60 stores in the whole country. The first Basel store opened on March 1, 2016.

India
On February 24, 2011, Dunkin' Donuts signed a master franchise agreement with Indian food service company Jubilant FoodWorks to operate the brand in India. Jubilant FoodWorks opened the country's first Dunkin' Donuts outlet at Connaught Place, New Delhi in April 2012. In November 2014, Dunkin' Donuts opened its first store in Kanpur, Uttar Pradesh inside Z Square Mall.

There were 32 Dunkin' Donuts outlets across 10 Indian cities as on December 31, 2019.

Spain
The term "Donuts" was already trademarked by one of the largest Spanish bakery firms, Panrico, so the company was born as a joint venture between Dunkin' Donuts' then-parent Allied Domecq and Panrico (only Spanish shareholders, representing 50%) in order to use the brand name "Dunkin' Donuts". In 2007, after Dunkin' Donuts bought out Panrico's 50% share, the stores were rebranded to "Dunkin' Coffee". As of 2017, there are 59 Dunkin' Coffee locations in Spain, the majority of which are in Barcelona, Madrid, and Málaga. Their slogan, "Juntos es mejor", translates to "Together is better".

Canada
Despite once having hundreds of stores nationwide, Dunkin' Donuts and its market share all but vanished from Canada by the turn of the century. In the late 1990s to early 2000s the chain began disappearing from all regions of Canada, with its last foothold in the province of Quebec. However, its decline was most apparent in Quebec, where the chain once had 210 stores but by mid 2017 had only three—the last franchises in the country. By then, only one free standing store had the facilities to make donuts fresh on site; the other two were merely shopping-mall food-court stands, dependent on the delivery of baked goods from the main store. One of the main reasons for Dunkin' Donuts' decline was competition with Tim Hortons, similar to Tim Hortons' own decline in the northeastern United States due to heavy competition from Dunkin' Donuts. A group of Dunkin' Donuts franchisees won a C$16.4 million civil court judgement against the parent company for failing to adequately promote the brand in Canada. In September 2018, after 57 years of operating in Canada, Dunkin' Donuts ceased business in that country when it refused to renew its franchise license to the few remaining stores left. All remaining Canadian locations were closed or rebranded as independent businesses in late 2018 – ending the presence of Dunkin' Donuts in the country.

Baskin-Robbins – a subsidiary of Dunkin' Brands – continues to operate stores across Canada.

Lebanon
Dunkin' opened its first location in Lebanon in 1998 and has since gained a lot of popularity among Lebanese people and is now one of the most popular coffee shops with many branches spread across the country.
In 2020 Dunkin' Lebanon started selling its products in supermarkets and grocery stores.

Japan
In 1970, Japan became the first Asian country to open Dunkin' Donuts stores. The Japanese chain was owned by a joint venture between the Saison Group, Yoshinoya, and the Japanese subsidiary of the Compass Group named Seiyo Food Systems. After 28 years of operating in Japan, Dunkin' Donuts ceased business there in 1998 due to declining sales and poor performance. All of the non-military base locations were either closed or converted to Mister Donut locations. Dunkin' still has locations in United States military bases, which are open only to military personnel.

Saudi Arabia
Dunkin' Donuts opened its first location in Saudi Arabia in 1986. As of October 2022, it operates over 500 stores and plans to operate more than 600 in the Kingdom by the end of 2022 due to the high coffee demand.

 Israel 
Dunkin' Donuts Israel was an Israeli franchise of the chain. Dunkin' Donuts Israel opened their first location within Israel in 1996 in Tel Aviv. Their main flagship store was located in Rabin Square, with their factory in Lod. Upon opening their first location Dunkin' was a tremendous hit. When the original location opened it broke Dunkin's own sales records by selling 3 million doughnuts in the first eight months. The chain's manager was quoted saying "Israelis do not stop eating doughnuts, They buy such quantities, quantities that we would never have believed they would buy. They buy boxes of 12, eat them here, and then buy more boxes to take home." In 2001, when Dunkin' Donuts Israel decided to close, the company had accumulated a large amount of debt. When the Second Intifada broke out, Israeli tourism slowed, and Dunkin' decided to close. Approximately $2 million was invested in Dunkin' Donuts Israel when it failed. At the peak, Dunkin' Donuts had 9 branches in Israel, of their original goal of 15, including 3 in Jerusalem.

New Zealand
The first New Zealand store opened in Manukau, Auckland in 2001; three others also opened in Auckland that year. By 2017, it had 12 Auckland stores and two other cities. By 2022, it had 15 Auckland stores and three other cities.

Notable endorsers

 Yoon Shi-yoon
 Eli Manning
 Charli D'Amelio
 Janno Gibbs (2002–2003)
 Joey de Leon (2004–2010)
 Derek Ramsay (2013–present)
 Jennylyn Mercado (2015–2016)
 Piolo Pascual (1990s, 2017–present)
 Dingdong Dantes (2019–present)
 David Ortiz
 Rob Gronkowski
 Meghan Duggan
SB19 (2021–present)
Kim Soo-hyun (2022–present)

Criticism
In 1997, Dunkindonuts.org was established by a customer for disgruntled consumers and employees to lodge complaints about the company. The site appeared ahead of the company's own website in many search engines and received national media coverage before being purchased by Dunkin' Donuts in 1999.

Dunkin' Donuts was criticized by one of its franchisees for allegedly forcing single-store owners to agree to a buyout at a loss for minor infractions. Dunkin' Donuts sued franchise owners 154 times from 2006 to April 2008. Over the same period, McDonald's was involved in five lawsuits. Subway, a company that has four times the number of locations as Dunkin' Donuts, sued its franchisees 12 times. (These figures do not include arbitrations, which the companies use in pursuing legal claims against their franchisees.) Franchisees allege that the company's business strategy needs predominantly multi-unit franchisees.

In 2009, the company temporarily stopped the sale of two of its products, the Dunkaccino'' and hot chocolate, after concern of a possible salmonella poisoning at a supplier's facilities. Dunkin' Donuts claims that none of the beverages were contaminated, but the recall was made out of safety for its consumers.

In May 2010, Dunkin' Donuts was criticized for advertising "Free Iced Coffee Day" on its national Facebook page, which took place in only 13 cities. Because of the limited scope of the promotion, many customers became dissatisfied with the lack of free iced coffee and vented their anger on the Dunkin' Donuts Facebook page.

In 2013, the Dunkin' Donuts chain in Thailand used an advertisement that contained a photograph of a woman in black face-paint, in order to promote its new chocolate-flavored donuts. The company was criticized for the advertisement, with the Human Rights Watch calling the advertisement "bizarre and racist". The headquarters in the United States apologized for the advertisement.

Nancy Lewis, in Canaan, Connecticut, began a petition in January 2014 to request that Dunkin' Donuts donate their unsold food to local shelters and food banks in her area after seeing her local shop regularly throwing away "large amounts" of unsold food. She said because the company has no official policy on the redistribution of its unsold food items to shelters or food banks, and employees are not allowed to take any home, many affiliates throw all of the goods away.

See also 
 List of coffeehouse chains
 List of doughnut shops
 Coffee wars
 Dunkin' Donuts Center – multipurpose arena in Providence, Rhode Island

Explanatory notes

References

External links

 

1950 establishments in Massachusetts
American companies established in 1950
Bagel companies
Bakeries of the United States
Coffee brands
Coffeehouses and cafés in the United States
Companies based in Massachusetts
Companies based in Norfolk County, Massachusetts
Doughnut shops
Fast-food chains of the United States
Fast-food franchises
Inspire Brands
Restaurants established in 1950
Restaurants in Massachusetts